Heart River is a settlement in northern Alberta, Canada within Big Lakes County.

See also 
List of communities in Alberta
List of settlements in Alberta

Big Lakes County